Knockboy ( meaning Yellow Hill), commonly referred to as Ballygunner, is a suburb and formerly a village on the outskirts of Waterford City, Ireland. Originally an independent village, it has become part of Waterford City, due to urban sprawl, and now forms part of the city's suburbs. It is within the dual parishes of St. Mary's and St Joseph and St. Benildus.

History
The old village of Knockboy consisted of an old 18th-century church, 19th-century schoolhouse, a row of cottages and a small pub at the base of the hill. In 1948, a new national school was built at the top of the hill. In 1980, the Waterford city boundaries extended, making Knockboy part of the Greater Waterford area. In 1984, the national school was moved to beside the Ballygunner GAA pitch, the old school buildings being developed into a Gaelscoil. In the early 1990s, the cottages were demolished and new council houses were built at the site. In the 2000s, a new housing estate was built adjoining the original village, in practise making it a suburb of Waterford City.

In late 2009, redevelopment of the old church began which involved extending two sides of the church.

In 2011, the crossroads at the site of Gaelscoile Baile Mhic Gonair were redeveloped to feature one single crossroad rather than two along with traffic lights.

References

Geography of Waterford (city)